Arie "Aad" Kosto  (born 9 January 1938) is a retired Dutch politician of the Labour Party (PvdA) and jurist.

Kosto attended the Gymnasium Leiden from April 1950 until June 1958 where he majored in Theology. Kosto worked as student researcher at the University of Amsterdam from June 1960 until July 1962. Kosto worked as a television producer, editor and screenwriter for the VARA from July 1962 until December 1972. Kosto was elected as a Member of the House of Representatives after the election of 1972, taking office on 7 December 1972. After the election of 1989 Kosto was appointed as State Secretary for Justice in the Cabinet Lubbers III, taking office on 7 November 1989. On 13 November 1991 Kosto was targeted by the radical activist group Revolutionary Anti-Racist Action (RaRa) who destroyed his house in Grootschermer with a bomb. Kosto was appointed as Minister of Justice following the resignation of Ernst Hirsch Ballin, taking office on 27 May 1994. After the election of 1994 Kosto returned as a Member of the House of Representatives, taking office on 17 May 1994. Following the cabinet formation of 1994 Kosto was not giving a cabinet post in the new cabinet and the Cabinet Lubbers III was replaced by the Cabinet Kok I on 22 August 1994 and continued to serve as a frontbencher. 

In August 1994 Kosto was nominated as a Member of the Council of State, he resigned as a Member of the House of Representatives the day he was installed as a Member of the Council of State, serving from 12 September 1994 until 1 February 2008. 

Kosto retired from active politic and became active in the public sector and occupied numerous seats as a nonprofit director on several boards of directors and supervisory boards (Stichting Pensioenfonds Zorg en Welzijn, Copyright and Patent association, Institute for Multiparty Democracy) and served on several state commissions and councils on behalf of the government (Probation Agency and the Custodial Institutions Agency)

Decorations

References

External links

Official
  Mr. A. (Aad) Kosto Parlement & Politiek

 

 

 

1938 births
Living people
Commanders of the Order of Orange-Nassau
Copyright activists
Dutch male dramatists and playwrights
Dutch lobbyists
Dutch male screenwriters
Dutch Mennonites
Dutch nonprofit directors
Dutch nonprofit executives
Dutch television editors
Dutch television producers
Dutch victims of crime
Knights of the Order of the Netherlands Lion
Labour Party (Netherlands) politicians
Members of the Council of State (Netherlands)
Members of the House of Representatives (Netherlands)
Ministers of Justice of the Netherlands
Officers of the Order of Leopold II
People from Alkmaar
People from Oegstgeest
State Secretaries for Justice of the Netherlands
Survivors of terrorist attacks
Terrorist incidents in the Netherlands in the 1990s
University of Amsterdam alumni
Academic staff of the University of Amsterdam
20th-century Dutch civil servants
20th-century Dutch jurists
20th-century Dutch male writers
20th-century Dutch military personnel
20th-century Dutch politicians
21st-century Dutch businesspeople
21st-century Dutch civil servants
21st-century Dutch jurists
21st-century Dutch male writers
21st-century Dutch politicians
20th-century Dutch dramatists and playwrights